Peter Lérant (born 30 January 1977) is a Slovak former football defender and football manager.

Career
After playing two seasons with DAC 1904 Dunajská Streda in the Mars Superliga he signed with Bayer 04 Leverkusen in 1998 but for the next two years he managed only to play for the reserves team. In summer 2000 he moved to Swiss club FC Lucerne, and after the winter break he continued in Greece with Panionios. In 2001, he signed with Austria Wien but in January 2002 he moved to Graz. Between summer 2002 and 2003 he played with Hungarian Újpest. In 2004, he moved to Croatia signing with Prva HNL club HNK Rijeka where he will find stability and stay for almost 3 seasons. He played with Polish Ekstraklasa club Wisla Plock before coming to Slovenia in 2007 to play with Gorica. In 2009, he played with Bulgarian Minyor Pernik.

International career
In the years 1999 and 2000 Lerant made 11 appearances for the U21 team. In February 2000, he was part of the unofficial Slovak team in the Cyprus International Football Tournament where he played in all 3 games.

He represented the Slovak team in the 2000 Summer Olympics in Sydney. He played in the team which finished 4th at the 2000 European U-21 Championship in Bratislava.

Career statistics

Player
Source:

Honours 
GAK Graz
Austrian Cup (1): 2002

HNK Rijeka
Croatian Cup (2): 2004–05, 2005–06

References

External sources
 
 Stats from Croatia at HRrepka. 
 Stats from Slovenia at PrvaLiga. 
 
 
 

1977 births
Living people
Sportspeople from Komárno
Slovak footballers
Slovak football managers
Slovak expatriate footballers
Slovakia under-21 international footballers
Olympic footballers of Slovakia
Association football defenders
KFC Komárno players
3. Liga (Slovakia) players
4. Liga (Slovakia) players
FC DAC 1904 Dunajská Streda players
Slovak Super Liga players
Bayer 04 Leverkusen II players
Regionalliga players
Expatriate footballers in Germany
Slovak expatriate sportspeople in Germany
FC Luzern players
Swiss Super League players
Expatriate footballers in Switzerland
Slovak expatriate sportspeople in Switzerland
Panionios F.C. players
Super League Greece players
Expatriate footballers in Greece
Slovak expatriate sportspeople in Greece
FK Austria Wien players
Grazer AK players
Austrian Football Bundesliga players
Expatriate footballers in Austria
Slovak expatriate sportspeople in Austria
Újpest FC players
Nemzeti Bajnokság I players
Expatriate footballers in Hungary
Slovak expatriate sportspeople in Hungary
BSV Bad Bleiberg players
2. Liga (Austria) players
HNK Rijeka players
Croatian Football League players
Expatriate footballers in Croatia
Slovak expatriate sportspeople in Croatia
Wisła Płock players
Ekstraklasa players
Expatriate footballers in Poland
Slovak expatriate sportspeople in Poland
ND Gorica players
Slovenian PrvaLiga players
Expatriate footballers in Slovenia
Slovak expatriate sportspeople in Slovenia
PFC Minyor Pernik players
First Professional Football League (Bulgaria) players
Expatriate footballers in Bulgaria
FK Marcelová players
Družstevník Topoľníky players
MŠK - Thermál Veľký Meder players
Footballers at the 2000 Summer Olympics
KFC Komárno managers
4. Liga (Slovakia) managers
MŠK - Thermál Veľký Meder managers
3. Liga (Slovakia) managers
FKM Nové Zámky managers
ŠKF iClinic Sereď managers
Slovak Super Liga managers
FC Nitra managers